Xtro II: The Second Encounter is a 1990 science fiction horror film directed by Harry Bromley Davenport and starring Jan-Michael Vincent, Paul Koslo, and Tara Buckman. The film is a sequel in name only to Xtro.

Plot

The U.S. Secretary of Defense Bob Kenmore (Bob Wilde) visits a government facility called Nexus, an underground laboratory controlled entirely by a computer, to witness a top-secret experiment which sends three volunteers to another dimension. 

When only one of them returns and the Defense Secretary threatens to shut Nexus down, the original architect of Nexus, Dr. Ron Sheppard, is coaxed out of retirement. Sheppard's by his former lover, Dr. Julie Cassidy, is now one of Nexus's top scientists, to help investigate what went wrong. Sheppard had been previously forced out if the project after a disastrous previous experiment resulted in the laboratory complex exploding.

Marshall, the sole survivor of the experiment, staggers back through the portal and is placed in sickbay. An alien parasite emerges from her body and escapes into the lab's ventilation system. The alien begins attacking the members of the research team.

The lab is automatically locked down and the survivors are fighting the clock as the safety protocols will automatically radioactively purge the lab in a few hours. 

It is discovered that Dr. Sheppard is also an alien host, he is sent back to the alien dimension.

Those remaining alive wonder how they will explain what has happened.

Production

Notably, aside from being in the science-fiction genre, this film has little in common with 1982's Xtro, having a largely dissimilar plot, and featuring none of the characters from the first film.

As Director Harry Bromley Davenport did not have the rights of the first movie, although he did own the rights to the title, he was unable to use the characters and situations from the first film. He also noted the surreal quality of the first film was difficult to replicate in the sequels.

The creature was designed by Charlie Grant and Wayne Dang, It appears to have been inspired by the work of H. R. Giger.

The script had four writers.

The film was made with the backing of North American Pictures.

Cast
 Jan-Michael Vincent as Dr. Ron Shepherd 
 Paul Koslo as Dr. Alex Summerfield 
 Tara Buckman as Dr. Julie Casserly
 Nicholas Lea as Baines
 Bob Wilde as Secretary Kenmore
 Rachel Hayward as Dr. Lisa Myers

Reception

Moria gave the film two out of four stars. While it found the film better than its reputation, it found it to be an uninspired. TV Guide found that while the movie was low budget, it is attractively photographed. However, it was not convinced by Jan-Michael Vincent's portrayal.

Home media
Image Entertainment released both original and special editions in 2005 and 2006. It was later released by Image as a 2-disk double feature alongside the first film in the series. It was last released on DVD by Film 2000 on 1 October 2007.

Sequel

This film was followed by 1993's Xtro 3: Watch the Skies, although that film has little to do with the original or this film. Xtro 4 was in the planning stages in 2011.

References

External links
 
 
 

1990 films
1990 horror films
1990s science fiction horror films
1990s monster movies
British monster movies
British science fiction horror films
Canadian monster movies
Canadian science fiction horror films
English-language Canadian films
1990s English-language films
Films about extraterrestrial life
Films directed by Harry Bromley Davenport
1990s Canadian films
1990s British films